Al-Ahli Sports Club (Arabic: النادي الأهلي الرياضي الأردني) is one of the oldest sports clubs in Jordan. Based in Amman, the club was established in 1944 by a group dedicated to setting the groundwork for sport, social, and cultural development in Jordan.

History

Handball Team history
He also organized 54 sports festivals including "Tilmatch" novels. He saw it until the end and it was rare to follow an event until the end. In the end, a team receded a lot in the 1980s and barely "sniffed" in the nineties. history club (AR)
According to the club, the team has 22 titles for the local league, but it is certified in the Jordanian league. (13 titles) missed the Ahli years of the coronation and the 1976 season. Until in the 1993 season when the arrival of the Iraqi coach Dafer Sahib returned to the podiums and maintained the league record until the season 2001, after which entered the Salt club as a competitor in the domestic league. Al-Ahli returned for the 2009 to 2012 season under the leadership of the coach and the President of the current Jordanian Union d. Tayseer Al-Mansi and passed the handball in the club with many crises, including the decision to cancel the game for more than once and then return. The women team who won the title was returned to seasons before the team was eliminated in handball. In Al Ahly, the team went through many crises and despite this came back strongly. After every crisis, Al Ahly is now considered the main breed of teams in Jordan.
Asian Club League Handball Championship is the best overseas achievement of the year (runners-up) 1998 Asian Club League.

Tournaments

Jordanian Premier League
(13) 1993-1994-1995-1996-1997-1998-2000-2001-2009-2010-2011-2012-2015

Jordanian Cup
(13) 1994-1995-1996-1998-2000-2002-2006-2007-2008 -2009-2012-2013-2015

Cup of Jordanian Cups
(9) 1995-1996-1998-2007-2008-2011-2012-2013-2014

Championship Shield Union
(3) 1995-1997-2006

Asian Club League Handball Championship
runners-up 1998

Arab Handball Championship of Champions
1995 5th

Arab Handball Championship of Winners' Cup

References

External links
 http://www.ahliclubjo.org
 http://www.goalzz.com/main.aspx?team=14718
 https://web.archive.org/web/20190521031732/http://jordanhf.com/
 https://www.addustour.com/
 https://alghad.com/
 http://alrai.com/

Handball in Jordan
Sports teams in Jordan
Sport in Amman